BOSIET stands for basic offshore safety induction and emergency training, a course created to assist in meeting the initial offshore safety training, emergency response training and assessment requirements for personnel new to the offshore, oil and gas and renewable energy industries.

Included in the course is helicopter survival, emergency first aid, sea survival, fire fighting, self rescue and Totally Enclosed Motor Propelled Survival Craft TEMPSC (lifeboat) training. The helicopter survival training (HUET) is often the hardest part.

Upon completion of the program, the delegate will have an awareness of the generic hazards and associated risks encountered when working on offshore installations and the generic safety regimes and safety management systems in place to control and mitigate risks associated with hazards.

References 

Emergency services in the Republic of Ireland
Petroleum production
Survival training